Jean-François-Joseph Rochechouart de Foudoas (27 January 1708 – 20 March 1777) was a French Roman Catholic Cardinal.

Born in Toulouse, he was educated in the University of Paris, where he achieved licentiate in theology. After having been ordained priest he became vicar general of the archdiocese of Rouen for seven years. Elected bishop of Laon on 18 September 1741 he was also French ambassador to the Holy See from 1758 to 1762.

Pope Clement XIII created him cardinal priest in the consistory of 23 November 1761 with the title of Sant'Eusebio. He participated in the Papal conclave of 1769, but not that of 1774-1775.

Rochechouart died in 1777 in Paris.

References

External links

 The Cardinals of the Holy Roman Church-Biographical Dictionary
 Catholic Hierarchy data for this Cardinal 

Jean-Francois-Joseph
1708 births
1777 deaths
Clergy from Toulouse
18th-century French cardinals
Bishops of Laon
18th-century peers of France